Aramaki (written: 荒巻 or 荒牧) is a Japanese surname. Notable people with the surname include:

Atsushi Aramaki (荒巻 淳, 1926–1971), Japanese baseball player
Shinji Aramaki (荒牧 伸志, born 1960), Japanese anime director and mechanical designer
Yōko Aramaki (荒牧 陽子, born 1981), Japanese singer and impressionist
Yoshio Aramaki (荒巻 義雄, born 1933), Japanese novelist

Fictional characters:
Daisuke Aramaki, a character in the Ghost in the Shell franchise

See also
Aramaki-jake, a kind of Japanese salted salmon

Japanese-language surnames